Burkovo is a rural locality (a village) in Posyolok Nikologory, Vyaznikovsky District, Vladimir Oblast, Russia. The population was 34 as of 2010.

Geography 
Burkovo is located 26 km southwest of Vyazniki (the district's administrative centre) by road. Mikhalishki is the nearest rural locality.

References 

Rural localities in Vyaznikovsky District